I Liked It Better When You Had No Heart is the fifth full-length studio album by Butch Walker, and the first released under the name Butch Walker and the Black Widows. On January 5, 2010 Walker released "Trash Day" as the first single, backed with the track "She Likes Hair Bands". The complete track list was made available on Butch's website in February 2010. The vinyl release was February 2, 2010, with the CD/digital release following on February 23, 2010. The album landed at #1 on the Billboard Heatseekers chart and #125 on the Billboard Hot 200.

A music video was shot for "Pretty Melody" and the video got considerable exposure when it became a featured video on YouTube. All songs were either written by Walker himself or co-written by Walker and Michael Trent, with the exception of "You Belong With Me," a bonus track made available through selected outlets when pre-ordering.

"You Belong With Me" is a Taylor Swift cover from her 2008 album Fearless. The popularity of Butch's version of the song increased significantly when Swift herself tweeted favorably about Walker's version. Walker was later invited to perform the song with her live at the Grammy awards. Walker's version of the song was sold digitally as a single before being offered as a bonus track on this album. All the bonus tracks on I Liked It Better When You Had No Heart were digital bonuses and not on the physical CD itself.

Track listing

Personnel
Butch Walker - lead vocals, acoustic & electric guitars, piano
Fran Capitanelli - guitars
Chris Unck - guitars, lap steel
Jake Sinclair - bass guitar
Wesley Flowers - keyboards
Darren Dodd - drums, percussion

References

 Official Website

2010 albums
Butch Walker albums
Albums produced by Butch Walker